Paramount Cars was a British company which produced the Paramount automobile between 1950 and 1956. Founded by WA Hudson and S Underwood from Derbyshire, the company initially manufactured cars in Swadlincote with production moving shortly after to Melbourne (again in Derbyshire) and then to Leighton Buzzard. Two models were produced, the Paramount Ten and the Paramount 1½-Litre.

History 
The Paramount had an aluminium over wood frame body with BMW like grille and was mounted on a separate tubular steel chassis with front transverse and rear semi elliptical leaf springs. It was originally intended to have Alvis engine and suspension but to reduce cost the production versions used Ford 10 components including the 1172 cc side valve engines, but fitted with twin SU carburettors, which resulted in poor performance. The car was listed in both 2 and 4 seat versions.

In 1953, the company was bought by Camden Motors and production moved to Leighton Buzzard and the Ford Consul 1,508 cc engine was an option in a longer chassis as also was a Wade or Shorrock supercharger. The price was now an uncompetitive £1009 and production ceased in 1956 after about 70 cars had been made.

After the end of car production the remaining chassis were sold off and several were fitted with Rochdale glass fibre bodies.

There was no connection with the two separate American Paramount Car companies of Azusa, California (1923-1924) and New York City (1927-1931).

Performance

The test car cost £1013 including taxes.

Gallery

See also
 List of car manufacturers of the United Kingdom

References

Bibliography
 Lawrence, Mike. (1991). AZ of Sports Cars since 1945 - page 252. Bay View Books. 
 Sedgwick, Michael. (1985) CARS OF THE FIFTIES AND SIXTIES - page 225. AB nordbook. 
 Georgano, G.N. (1973) The Complete Encyclopedia of Motorcars1885 to the present - page 536. Ebury Press.

External links
Paramount Cars at cartype.com

Defunct motor vehicle manufacturers of England
Companies based in Derbyshire
Companies based in Bedfordshire